Hypsipyla grandella is a moth of the  family Pyralidae. It is found in  southern Florida (United States), most of the West Indies, Sinaloa and southward in Mexico, Central America, South America except Chile and in Mauritius.

The larvae cause damage by feeding on new shoots of mahogany (Swietenia spp.) and cedro (also known as Spanish-cedar and tropical-cedar; Cedrela spp.). H. grandella feeds on the West Indies mahoganies in southern Florida, which restricts the reproduction of the mahogany population. The insects prefer a tree that gets full sun light, and isn't being shaded by a canopy level. 

The larvae are often called mahogany shoot borers, but the name may differ by country.

References

External links
mahogany shoot borer on the UF / IFAS Featured Creatures Web site

Moths described in 1848
Phycitini
Moths of Mauritius
Moths of North America
Moths of South America
Moths of the Caribbean